Scythris atlasensis is a moth of the family Scythrididae. It was described by Bengt Å. Bengtsson in 1997. It is found in Morocco.

References

atlasensis
Moths described in 1997